Felipe Jonathan Rocha Andrade (born 15 February 1998), known as Felipe Jonatan, is a Brazilian footballer who plays for  santos  as left back.

Club career

Ceará
Born in Fortaleza, Ceará, Felipe Jonatan joined Ceará's youth setup from Bahia. He made his senior debut on 22 August 2017, starting in a 2–0 home defeat of Tiradentes, for the year's Copa Fares Lopes.

Felipe Jonatan was promoted to the main squad for the 2018 season, and was initially a backup to Rafael Carioca and new signing João Lucas. After the arrival of Lisca as new manager, he became the club's first choice, making his debut in the Série A on 6 September by starting in a 2–1 home win against Corinthians.

On 31 October 2018, Felipe Jonatan renewed his contract until May 2022. He scored his first senior goal the following 6 February, netting the opener in a 1–1 away draw against Central, for the year's Copa do Brasil.

Santos

On 1 March 2019, Felipe Jonatan signed a five-year contract with Santos, for a rumoured fee of R$ 6 million. He made his debut for the club the following day, starting in a 3–2 home win against Oeste for the year's Campeonato Paulista.

Felipe Jonatan scored his first goal for Peixe on 28 April 2019, netting his team's second in a 2–1 away defeat of Grêmio.

Career statistics

References

External links

1998 births
Living people
Sportspeople from Fortaleza
Brazilian footballers
Association football defenders
Campeonato Brasileiro Série A players
Ceará Sporting Club players
Santos FC players
Brazil youth international footballers